The Star Screen Award for Best Actor (Critics) is an Indian cinema award.

Winners

See also
 Screen Awards
 Bollywood
 Cinema of India

References

Screen Awards